The Klemm L 26, later Klemm Kl 26, was a low-wing trainer aircraft built by Klemm.

Design and development 
The L 26 was a larger, reinforced development of the Klemm L 25.

Like the L 25, the L 26 was a single engined low-wing monoplane with fixed conventional landing gear.  Most variants were two-seaters with tandem open cockpits.

Operational history 
The L 26 was first flown in 1928 and entered production the following year and was produced until 1936.  The L 26 was also produced in the United States by Aeromarine-Klemm as the AKL-26.

Other notable pilots of the L 26 included Ernst Udet and Elly Beinhorn.

Variants

Klemm 
This is an incomplete list.

L 26 II
Two-seat trainer, radial engine
L 26 IIc, cowl ring
L 26 III
Enclosed cockpit
L 26 V
Two-seat trainer
L 26 Va, 95 hp Argus As 8A-2 engine
L 26 Vc, 120 hp Argus As 8 engine; most produced variant
L 26 Ve, 120 hp Argus As 8A-3 engine
VL 26
Three-seat touring aircraft

L 27
Enlarged front cockpit
L 28
Aerobatics aircraft, 150 hp Siemens-Halske Sh 14A engine
L 30
Homebuilt aircraft based on the L 25/26

Aeromarine-Klemm 

AKL-60
Prototypes of the AKL-26, 3 built
AKL-26
70 hp LeBlond engine, 7 built
AKL-26 Special
Floatplane conversion of the AKL-26 with Edo floats and a 65 hp Velie M-5 engine, one converted
AKL-26A
Extra fuel tank, one AKL-26 converted
L-26A
Floatplane version of the AKL-26A, at least 14 built
L-26B
Also AKL-26B or AKL-85, 85 hp LeBlond 85-5DF engine, floats optional
L-26X
65 hp Velie M-5 engine
L-27
Also AKL-27, L-26B with 110 hp LeBlond 110-7DF engine

Survivors 

Of the 170 aircraft built in Germany, only one survived World War II, and that aircraft no longer exists.  However, an American-built AKL-26 is on display in a dismantled state at Old Rhinebeck Aerodrome in Red Hook, New York.

Specifications (AKL-26A)

See also

References 

Klemm aircraft
1920s German civil trainer aircraft
1920s German sport aircraft
Single-engined tractor aircraft
Aircraft first flown in 1928